Jorge Manuel Vasconcelos Leitão (born 14 January 1974) is a Portuguese retired footballer who played as a striker, and is a manager.

He was known for his six-year spell with Walsall in England, but he also scored 28 goals in 169 games in the Portuguese Segunda Liga over seven seasons.

Club career

Early years / Walsall
Born in Nespereira, Cinfães, Viseu District, Leitão started playing in amateur football. At already 24 he signed with C.D. Feirense, being relegated from the Segunda Liga in his first season and netting 14 goals in his second. In July 2000 he moved to England with Walsall, who paid £150,000 for his services after an impressive trial spell.

Leitão scored a career-best 18 goals in 44 matches in his first season with Walsall, with the Saddlers promoting to the Championship after disposing of Reading in the play-offs final. He was also named in the Division Two Player's Team of the Year.

In 2001–02, after a difficult start, Leitão's fate was transformed following the sacking of Ray Graydon. In the first game under new manager Colin Lee, he scored a brace at Charlton Athletic in the campaign's FA Cup fourth round. The team also managed to finally stay clear of the relegation zone, and he netted the goal that saved them from the drop, the only one in an away win over Sheffield United on 13 April 2002; two weeks later, he extended his contract for a further two years.

2002–03 was Walsall's most successful season in the league since the 1950s, with Leitão pairing with Brazilian José Junior for a Portuguese-speaking front line which scored 30 goals. Highlights included a brace against Stoke City (4–2 home win), one against Grimsby Town (3–1, home) and the game's only against Brighton & Hove Albion (also at home); however, after the loss of Júnior to Derby County in the summer – his replacement being former Arsenal and England star Paul Merson – the team suffered relegation, with Leitão netting seven goals (his lowest figure in one full season) in 39 games.

In late December 2005, Leitão signed a pre-contract deal with S.C. Beira-Mar in his country, citing homesickness as a factor in his sudden departure from English football. Though the contract did not come into effect until June 2006, both Merson (now the team's manager) and chairman Jeff Bonser offered to release the player earlier, in recognition of the dedication he had given to the club in his five and a half years of service. The penultimate of his 262 competitive matches for Walsall (71 goals) was a 0–3 away defeat against Bristol City, in which he also suffered a groin injury; in his last, at Bescot Stadium against Blackpool, he was treated to a near half-hour rendition of his name by the home fans, eventually being reduced to tears before leaving the field through a guard of honour composed of some of his teammates.

Late career
After helping Beira-Mar promote to the Primeira Liga in 2006, Leitão had his first – and only – experience in the competition, scoring twice in 11 appearances as the Aveiro side was immediately relegated back. He subsequently spent two and a half seasons with Feirense (in the second level) and, aged 35, moved to modest F.C. Arouca, which he helped reach the top flight for the first time ever.

Immediately after retiring, Leitão was named his last club's assistant coach. On 21 March 2017 he became the third first-team manager of the season after Lito Vidigal and Manuel Machado. He was not able to prevent top-tier relegation, after winning only once in his five games in charge.

Honours
Walsall
Football League Second Division: Play-off winner 2001

Beira-Mar
Segunda Liga: 2005–06

Arouca
Segunda Divisão: 2009–10

References

External links

1974 births
Living people
Portuguese footballers
Association football forwards
Primeira Liga players
Liga Portugal 2 players
Segunda Divisão players
S.C. Coimbrões players
C.D. Feirense players
S.C. Beira-Mar players
F.C. Arouca players
English Football League players
Walsall F.C. players
Portuguese expatriate footballers
Expatriate footballers in England
Portuguese expatriate sportspeople in England
Portuguese football managers
Primeira Liga managers
People from Cinfães
Sportspeople from Viseu District